Adolph II of Isenburg-Wächtersbach was a German count of Isenburg-Wächtersbach.

The county itself lasted from 1673 to 1806 in the central Holy Roman Empire, until it was mediatised to Isenburg.

Marriage 
Adolph married the countess Philippine zu Ysenburg-Philippseich (1798-1877) on 14 October 1823 in Philippseich. The couple had one child.

 Ferdinand Maximilian, Count zu Ysenburg-Büdingen-Wächtersbach (born 9 October 1847), first Prince zu Ysenburg-Büdingen-Wächtersbach, married the princess Auguste von Hanau (born 21 Sep 1829, dead 18 Sep 1887) on 17 July 1849 in Wilhelmshöhe, daughter of the Elector of Hesse.

Ancestry

References

Counts of Isenburg-Wächtersbach
18th-century German people
1795 births
1859 deaths